Candleberry tree is a common name for several plants and may refer to:

Aleurites moluccanus
Myrica cerifera, native to North and Central America and the Caribbean
Triadica sebifera, native to eastern China and Taiwan